The following is a list of the 22 communes in French Guiana, France.

The communes cooperate in the following intercommunalities (as of 2020):
Communauté d'agglomération du Centre Littoral
Communauté de communes de l'Est Guyanais
Communauté de communes de l'Ouest Guyanais
Communauté de communes des Savanes

References

Guyane
 
French Guiana